Erytholus is a form genus for problematic fossils of Cambrian age in South Australia. It has been of special interest because of its morphological similarity with the Ediacaran fossil Ventogyrus, and may have been a late surviving vendobiont. It could be a slime mold.

Description 

Erytholus is a globose, chambered fossil, with associated vertical tubular structures. Its preservation in sandstone is similar to the Ediacaran type preservation of the vendobiont Ventogyrus. It is found at depths of  within paleosols. Its affinities are uncertain, although it bears a general resemblance to truffles.

References 

Cambrian fossil record
Controversial taxa